The Post Register is a U.S. daily newspaper serving the Idaho Falls, Idaho, area, as well as Jackson, Wyoming, and West Yellowstone, Montana. It is owned by the Adams Publishing Group.

History 
In 1931, the local Daily Post merged with Times-Register to become the Post Register.

Jim Brady, entered the business in 1933. In 1941, Jim Brady's brother Robb entered the business. Robb Brady was given the position of publisher in 1977 when the previous publisher died.

In 1984 Jim Brady died and shortly thereafter his son, Jerry Brady, entered the family business. Jerry Brady was named publisher in 1988 after Rob Brady retired.

In 1998, a number of family shareholders sold 49% of their interest in the company to an Employee Stock Ownership Trust, and established employees of The Post Company as official stockholders of the business. The Brady family maintained enough stock, however, to maintain control of the company.

In 2002, Jerry Brady ran as a Democrat for Governor of Idaho and named Roger Plothow publisher. Brady lost the election to Governor Dirk Kempthorne. After losing the election, Brady officially turned over the title of editor and publisher to Plothow.

In 2005, the paper won the Scripps Howard Foundation's First Amendment prize for an exposé on pedophilia in scouting. Post-Register journalist Peter Zuckerman won the Livingston Award in the category of local reporting for his work on the same story.

In November 2015, the Post Company, which owned the Post Register as well as weekly newspapers Shelley Pioneer, Challis Messenger, and Jefferson Star, was purchased by the Adams Publishing Group, a family-owned media company based in St. Louis Park, Minnesota.

Notes

External links
 Post Register Website - paid subscription required for access

Post Register, The
Daily newspapers published in the United States
Idaho Falls, Idaho
Publications established in 1925